Mary Carroll High School, often referred to as Carroll, is one of six high schools that are part of the Corpus Christi Independent School District.

History
Opened in 1957, Mary Carroll High School is currently the second largest and third oldest school in the Corpus Christi Independent School District. The school is named for the Corpus Christi Independent School District's first female superintendent. Carroll has since moved schools as of August, 2022.

School Motto
Educandi fortitudo. Eliminare infirmitate.

Administrative
Carroll's operating budget for the 2009–2010 school year was $13,557,830.00. Their attendance rate for 2008-2009 was 94.0%.

Ethnicity
Mary Carroll's ethnicity distribution for the 2009–2010 school year was 64.7% Hispanic, 25.0% White, 6.7% African-American, 3.2% Asian/Pacific Islander, and .4% Native American.

Notable alumni
Cliff Pennington, Major League infielder for the Los Angeles Angels of Anaheim
Jeremy Jordan, Broadway actor, nominated for a Tony Award for his role in Newsies
Gina M. Benavides, Justice, Texas Thirteenth Court of Appeals
Brooks Kieschnick, an American baseball player
Terry Labonte, an American NASCAR driver
Bobby Labonte, an American NASCAR driver
Chris Richardson, a former member of the Harlem Globetrotters
Paula DeAnda, an American musician
Mando Saenz, an American singer and songwriter
Phil Blackmar, professional golfer on PGA Tour

References

External links

Corpus Christi Independent School District high schools
Educational institutions established in 1957
High schools in Corpus Christi, Texas
1957 establishments in Texas